Dominic Rayner (born 26 August 1983) is a New Zealand cricketer. He played in one first-class match for Central Districts in 2007.

See also
 List of Central Districts representative cricketers

References

External links
 

1983 births
Living people
New Zealand cricketers
Central Districts cricketers
People from Marton, New Zealand